The Mother Teresa Memorial House is dedicated to the Catholic saint and Nobel Peace Prize laureate Mother Teresa. It is located in her hometown Skopje, in North Macedonia, where she lived from 1910 to 1928. The memorial house was built on the popular Macedonia Street in the Centar municipality, on the very location of the once Sacred Heart of Jesus Roman Catholic Church, where Mother Teresa was baptized. It lies just east of the Ristiḱ Palace and the Macedonia Square. In the first three weeks, the memorial house was visited by 12,000 people.

Opening
The memorial house worth two million euro was opened on 30 January 2009 by Macedonian Prime Minister Nikola Gruevski and is one of Skopje's newest landmarks. The opening was attended by foreign delegations, members of the Roman Catholic Church in North Macedonia and Macedonian Orthodox Church. One week prior to the opening, the Macedonian Foreign Minister Antonio Milošoski placed a commemorative plate at Mother Teresa's grave in Kolkata, India, with the engravement "Token of Gratitude from the Republic of Macedonia and the Fellow-Citizens of Her Native Town Skopje".

Architecture

Construction of the house began in May 2008. The project was financed by the Government of Macedonia and carried out by the Ministry of Culture. It is a modern, transformed version of Mother Teresa's birth house with a multifunctional but sacral character. Inside the house, part of her relics are preserved, which were transferred to Skopje with support of the Roman Catholic Church of Skopje, an arrangement announced by Nikola Gruevski at the grand opening. There is a museum which includes realistic sculptures of Mother Teresa and members of her family. One sculpture shows Mother Teresa as a ten-year-old child, sitting on a stone and holding a pigeon in her hands. The house also hosts cultural exhibits and includes a gallery. The architect of the project is Vangel Božinovski, assisted by Slobodan Arsovski.

Response
Architecture professor Divna Pencić has called the building “a tactless and tasteless homage to Mother Teresa” and “a depressing example of political meddling”:

References

External links

Official website of Memorial House of Mother Teresa (in English, Macedonian and Albanian)
Media Information Agency (in English)
Media Information Agency (in Macedonian)
Vest newspaper (in Macedonian)
Večer newspaper (in Macedonian)

Houses in North Macedonia
Buildings and structures in Skopje
Religious buildings and structures completed in 2009
Museums in North Macedonia
Museums established in 2009
Memorials to Mother Teresa